This is a list of members of the Tasmanian House of Assembly, elected at the 2014 state election.

1 Greens MHA for Bass Kim Booth resigned on 20 May 2015. He was replaced in a countback held on 9 June 2015 by Andrea Dawkins.
2 Greens MHA for Franklin Nick McKim resigned on 4 August 2015 to take up appointment to the Australian Senate seat vacated by Christine Milne. He was replaced in a countback held on 17 August 2015 by Rosalie Woodruff.
3 Liberal MHA for Franklin Paul Harriss resigned on 17 February 2016. He was replaced in a countback held on 1 March 2016 by Nic Street.
4 Labor MHA for Braddon and Opposition Leader Bryan Green resigned on 17 March 2017. He was replaced in a countback held on 3 April 2017 by Shane Broad.

Distribution of seats

See also
List of past members of the Tasmanian House of Assembly

References
Tasmanian Electoral Commission – 2014 election results

Members of Tasmanian parliaments by term
21st-century Australian politicians